The South Side Elevated is a branch of the Chicago "L" system in Chicago, Illinois that is served by the Green Line. It has on average 12,509 passengers, counting branch divisions, boarding each weekday as of February 2013, according to the Chicago Transit Authority.

Route
The South Side Elevated serves the Near South Side, Douglas, Bronzeville, Grand Boulevard, and Washington Park neighborhoods of Chicago and has stops near the Illinois Institute of Technology and the University of Chicago.

The South Side Elevated continues to the Englewood branch and the Jackson Park branch.

History
The South Side Elevated started passenger service on June 6, 1892, with service as far south as 39th Street (Pershing Road), making the branch the oldest section of the Chicago "L". On January 22, 1893, service on the line was extended as far south as 61st Street. The Jackson Park branch was added later in 1893 to serve the site of the 1893 World's Fair. Several other branches over time to serve parts of the city, though most have since been demolished. The Englewood branch was opened in 1905, followed by the Kenwood and Normal Park branches in 1907, and the Stock Yards branch in 1908. Today, only the Englewood (now Ashland) and Jackson Park (now East 63rd) branches remain.

In 1993, the Green Line was created when the CTA color-coded the lines. In 1994, the 58th station closed while remaining stations were renovated or rebuilt entirely depending on their condition. In 2012, the platform of the 58th station was completely demolished. In 2015, a new  station opened in the same location as the original Cermak station, to serve the McCormick Place convention center.

Station listing

Image gallery

External links
Green Line: South Side Elevated at Chicago-L.org

References

Railway lines in Chicago
Chicago Transit Authority